"As Any Fool Can See" is a song written by Paul Nelson and Kenny Beard, and recorded by American country music artist Tracy Lawrence. It was released on December 13, 1994 as the second single from his album, I See It Now. The song peaked at number 2 on the U.S. Billboard Hot Country Songs chart and at number 18 on Canada's RPM country chart.

Critical reception
Deborah Evans Price, of Billboard magazine, reviewed the song favorably, saying that while Lawrence has "employed the fiddle hook at least once before" and the "melody does sound awfully familiar", the formula works due to his "usual wide-eyed and soulful vocal approach."

Music video
The music video is a continuation of a Quantum Leap theme from many music videos Lawrence released in the mid-1990s. This particular video begins with the ending of the previous video for "I See It Now." Lawrence is "leaped" onto a ship that is being robbed by pirates. This scene alternates with Lawrence performing "As Any Fool Can See" in a rough Seaman's bar. Back on the ship, he emerges from below deck dressed as a pirate. After fighting through the other pirates, he rescues a woman that the pirates are trying to make walk the plank. As Lawrence jumps into the water, he is "leaped" to the next video, "Texas Tornado."

Chart performance
"As Any Fool Can See" debuted at number 59 on the U.S. Billboard Hot Country Singles & Tracks for the week of December 31, 1994.

Year-end charts

References

1994 singles
1994 songs
Tracy Lawrence songs
Atlantic Records singles
Songs written by Paul Nelson (songwriter)
Songs written by Kenny Beard